Verein für Leibesübungen is a common prefix part of the name for German sports clubs. It can refer to:

 VfL Algenrodt, sports club in Algenrodt, Idar-Oberstein, Rheinland-Pfalz
 VfL Altenbögge, association football club in Bönen, Nordrhein-Westfalen
 VfL Benrath, sports club in Düsseldorf, Nordrhein-Westfalen
 VfL Bergen 94, sports club in Bergen auf Rügen, Mecklenburg-Vorpommern
 VfL Birkenau, association football club in Birkenau, Hessen
 VfL Nord Berlin, association football club in Berlin
 VfL Eintracht Bitterfeld, sports club in Bitterfeld-Wolfen, Sachsen-Anhalt
 VfL Bochum, sports club in Bochum, Nordrhein-Westfalen
 VfL Duisburg-Süd, sports club in Duisburg, Nordrhein-Westfalen
 VfL Edewecht, sports club in Edewecht, Niedersachsen
 VfL Engelskirchen, sports club in Engelskirchen, Nordrhein-Westfalen
 VfL Fredenbeck, sports club in Fredenbeck, Niedersachsen
 VfL Frohnlach, sports club in Ebersdorf bei Coburg, Oberfranken
 VfL 1990 Gera, sports club in Gera, Thüringen
 VfL Germania 1894, association football club in Frankfurt am Main, Hessen
 VfL Gladbeck, sports club in Gladbeck, Nordrhein-Westfalen
 VfL Günzburg, sports club in Günzburg, Schwaben
 VfL Grün-Gold Güstrow, sports club in Güstrow, Mecklenburg-Vorpommern
 VfL Gummersbach, sports club in Gummersbach, Nordrhein-Westfalen, best known for its handball section
 VfL Eintracht Hagen, sports club in Hagen, Nordrhein-Westfalen 
 VfL Halle 1896, sports club in Halle, Sachsen-Anhalt
 VfL 93 Hamburg, sports club in Hamburg
 VfL Hameln, sports club in Hameln, Niedersachsen
 VfL Hannover,  sports club in Hannover, Niedersachsen
 VfL Herzlake, sports club in Herzlake, Niedersachsen
 VfL Kirchheim/Teck, sports club in Kirchheim unter Teck, Baden-Württemberg
 VfL Klafeld-Geisweid 08, association football club in Siegen, Nordrhein-Westfalen
 VfL Köln 1899, sports club in Köln, Nordrhein-Westfalen 
 VfL Germania Leer, sports club in Leer, Niedersachsen
 VfL Leverkusen, association football club in Leverkusen, Nordrhein-Westfalen
 VfL Lintorf, sports club in Bad Essen, Niedersachsen
 VfL 1860 Marburg, sports club in Marburg, Hessen
 VfL Meiningen 04, association football club in Meiningen, Thüringen
 Borussia VfL 1900 Mönchengladbach, sports club in Mönchengladbach, Nordrhein-Westfalen
 VfL Nauen, sports club in Nauen, Brandenburg
 VfL Bad Nauheim, sports club in Bad Nauheim, Hessen
 VfL Neckarau, sports club in Mannheim, Baden-Württemberg
 VfL Neckargartach, sports club in Heilbronn, Baden-Württemberg
 VfL Neustadt/Coburg, association football club in Neustadt bei Coburg, Oberfranken
 VfL Neustadt/Weinstraße, association football club in Neustadt an der Weinstraße, Rheinland-Pfalz
 VfL Neuwied, sports club in Neuwied, Rheinland-Pfalz
 VfL Oldenburg, sports club in Oldenburg, Niedersachsen
 VfL Oldesloe, sports club in Bad Oldesloe, Schleswig-Holstein
 VfL Osnabrück, sports club in Osnabrück, Niedersachsen
 VfL Osterspai, sports club in Osterspai, Rheinland-Pfalz
 VfL Oythe, sports club in Vechta, Niedersachsen
 VfL Pfullingen, sports club in Pfullingen, Baden-Württemberg
 VfL Pinneberg, sports club in Pinneberg, Schleswig-Holstein
 VfL Pirna-Copitz, sports club in Pirna, Sachsen
 1. VfL Potsdam, handball club in Potsdam, Brandenburg
 VfL Reken, association football club in Reken, Nordrhein-Westfalen 
 VfL Rhede, sports club in Rhede, Nordrhein-Westfalen 
 VfL 06 Saalfeld, association football club in Saalfeld/Saale, Thüringen
 VfL Sankt Augustin, sports club in Sankt Augustin-Mülldorf, Nordrhein-Westfalen
 VfL Bad Schwartau, sports club in Bad Schwartau, Schleswig-Holstein
 VfL Schwerin, former association football club in Schwerin, Mecklenburg
 VfL Sindelfingen, sports club in Sindelfingen, Baden-Württemberg
 VfL Stade, sports club in Stade, Niedersachsen
 VfL Stettin, former association football club in Stettin, Pommern
 VfL Trier, sports club in Trier, Rheinland-Pfalz
 VfL Ulm/Neu-Ulm, sports club in Ulm, Baden-Württemberg
 VfL Waiblingen, sports club in Waiblingen, Baden-Württemberg
 VfL Wildenfels, sports club in Wildenfels, Sachsen
 VfL Wittekind Wildeshausen, sports club in Wildeshausen, Niedersachsen
 VfL Wolfsburg, sports club in Wolfsburg, Niedersachsen